is a railway station in the town of Ono, Tamura District, Fukushima Prefecture, Japan operated by East Japan Railway Company (JR East).

Lines
Ononiimachi Station is served by the Ban'etsu East Line, and is located 40.1 rail kilometers from the official starting point of the line at Iwaki Station.

Station layout
The station has a single island platform connected to the station building by an underground passage. The station has a Midori no Madoguchi staffed ticket office.

Platforms

History
Ononiimachi Station opened on March 21, 1915. The station was absorbed into the JR East network upon the privatization of the Japanese National Railways (JNR) on April 1, 1987.

Passenger statistics
In fiscal 2018, the station was used by an average of 390 passengers daily (boarding passengers only).

Surrounding area

Ono Town Hall
Ono Niimachi Post Office

See also
 List of railway stations in Japan

References

External links

  JR East Station information 

Stations of East Japan Railway Company
Railway stations in Fukushima Prefecture
Ban'etsu East Line
Railway stations in Japan opened in 1915
Ono, Fukushima